The Ogmore by-election of 1931 was held on 19 May 1931.  The by-election was held due to the death of the incumbent Labour MP, Vernon Hartshorn.  It was won by the Labour candidate Ted Williams, a miners' agent and a member of Glamorgan County Council.

Hartshorn had held the seat since 1918 and at the last general election, had been elected with a majority of over 11,000 over the second placed candidate, the Liberal D. L. Powell. On that occasion the Conservative candidate had come third, and J. R. Campbell, Communist, had finished in last place. Neither the Liberals nor the Conservatives fielded a candidate in the by-election, although the Conservatives would contest the seat at the general election a few months later.

Result

See also
 1946 Ogmore by-election
 2002 Ogmore by-election
 2016 Ogmore by-election

References

Further reading 
 
 
A Vision Of Britain Through Time (Constituency elector numbers)

Ogmore by-election
Ogmore by-election
1930s elections in Wales
Ogmore by-election
Politics of Glamorgan
By-elections to the Parliament of the United Kingdom in Welsh constituencies
1930s in Glamorgan